Katchatheevu is a 163-acre uninhabited island administered by Sri Lanka and was a disputed territory claimed by India until 1976. The island is located between Neduntheevu, Sri Lanka and Rameswaram, India and has been traditionally used by both Sri Lankan Tamil and Indian fishermen. In 1974, then Prime Minister of India, Indira Gandhi ceded Katchatheevu to Sri Lanka under the "Indo-Sri Lankan Maritime agreement" aimed at resolving the maritime boundaries in the Palk Strait. Another agreement signed in 1976 restricted both the countries’ fishermen from fishing in the other’s exclusive economic zones.

Earlier, it was owned by the Ramnad Kingdom of Ramanathapuram Rameshwaram which later came under the Madras Presidency during British rule of India. It was recognised by Ceylon as part of British India after the delimitation of Gulf of Mannar and Palk Strait between the then governments of Madras and Ceylon. However in 1921, Sri Lanka reinstated its claims to Katchatheevu.

Geography 
Katchatheevu is a  island situated on the Sri Lankan side of the maritime boundary.

History 

During the medieval period, this island along with Pamban Island was in the possession of Jaffna Kingdom. From 17th century onwards island used to be a part of the Ramnad Kingdom which existed in Madurai district of India. Later, with British rule on the Indian subcontinent, the island became part of the Madras Presidency.

Ownership of the island was controversial up until 1974 as during the British rule, the island was administered by both countries. India then recognized equal ownership with Sri Lanka. The legality of the transfer was challenged in the Indian Supreme Court since the recognizing was not ratified by the Indian Parliament. This recognition of an island that is culturally important to fishermen of Tamil Nadu state in India has led to some agitations by Tamil Nadu politicians that it should be claimed to Indian sovereignty. The island is also important for fishing grounds used by fishers from both countries. The Indo-Sri Lankan agreement allows Indian fishermen to fish around Katchatheevu and to dry their nets on the island. As part of the Sri Lankan Civil War, the arrangement led to many difficulties with the Sri Lankan Navy, which was deployed to prevent smuggling of weapons by the rebel group LTTE. The island has a Catholic shrine that attracted devotees from both countries.

The main problem continues to grow as more fisherman move into the Sri Lankan sea area for illegal poaching. In 2010 the Sri Lankan government issued a notice to the Tamil Nadu government saying the Indian court cannot nullify the 1974 agreement.

In June 2011 the new Tamil Nadu government led by the chief minister of Tamil Nadu, J. Jayalalithaa, filed a petition in the Supreme Court that the declaration of the 1974 and 1976 agreements between India and Sri Lanka on ceding of Katchatheevu to Sri Lanka were unconstitutional. The court ruled in the Berubari case that the cession of Indian territory to another country had to be ratified by parliament through amendment of the Constitution.

However, the Indian government has stated, "No territory belonging to India was ceded nor sovereignty relinquished since the area was in dispute and had never been demarcated" and that the dispute on the status of the island was settled in 1974 by an agreement, and both countries took into account historical evidence and legal aspects.

St. Anthony's  Shrine 
St Antony's shrine is the only structure on the island. It is a shrine-church named after Antony of Padua, considered a patron saint of seafarers by Christians. It was built by a prosperous Indian Catholic (Tamilian) fisherman  Srinivasa Padaiyachi in the early 20th century. The annual church festival runs for three days. Christian priests from both India and Sri Lanka conduct the worship services (mass) and procession. Pilgrims from India are ferried mostly from Rameswaram. According to the agreement between the Indian and Sri Lankan government, the citizens of India are not required to possess an Indian passport or Sri Lankan visa for visiting Kachchatheevu. The island lacks drinking water.

See also 
Extreme points of Sri Lanka
India–Sri Lanka maritime boundary agreements
Palk Strait bridge 
India - Sri Lanka land border

References 

Delft DS Division
Uninhabited islands of Sri Lanka
India–Sri Lanka relations